Yellur may refer to,

 Yellur, Belgaum, a village in Belgaum district in Karnataka, India.
 Yellur, Udupi, a village in Udupi district in Karnataka, India.
 Yellur, Adilabad, a village in Adilabad district, Andhra Pradesh, India.
 Yellur, Mahbubnagar, a village in  Mahbubnagar district, Andhra Pradesh, India.